This is a list of law enforcement agencies in Scotland.

Police
Police Scotland
British Transport Police
Ministry of Defence Police
Civil Nuclear Constabulary

Bodies with police powers
National Crime Agency

Bodies with limited executive powers
Border Force
Immigration Enforcement
Her Majesty's Revenue and Customs
Driver and Vehicle Standards Agency

Bodies with solely investigatory powers
Office for Security and Counter-Terrorism
Security Service

Bodies hosted by the Association of Chief Police Officers
National Wildlife Crime Unit
National Counter Terrorism Security Office
National Vehicle Crime Intelligence Service

Bodies hosted by territorial police forces
National Domestic Extremism and Disorder Intelligence Unit
Protection Command
National Fraud Intelligence Bureau
National Ballistics Intelligence Service

Environmental regulation
Scottish Environment Protection Agency

See also
List of law enforcement agencies in the United Kingdom, Crown Dependencies and British Overseas Territories
List of law enforcement agencies in England and Wales
List of law enforcement agencies in Northern Ireland

References
List of UK police forces – Police.uk

 
Law enforcement agencies
Law enforce
Lists of law enforcement agencies